Erny Kirchen (born 7 April 1949) is a former Luxembourgian cyclist. He competed in the individual road race at the 1972 Summer Olympics. He is the nephew of cyclist Jeng Kirchen and the father of cyclist Kim Kirchen.

References

External links
 

1949 births
Living people
Luxembourgian male cyclists
Olympic cyclists of Luxembourg
Cyclists at the 1972 Summer Olympics
Sportspeople from Luxembourg City